Rhiwlas may refer to:

 Rhiwlas, Llanddeiniolen, Gwynedd, Wales, United Kingdom
 Rhiwlas, Llandderfel, Gwynedd, Wales, United Kingdom
 Rhiwlas, Powys, Wales, United Kingdom